The Central District of Eslamabad-e Gharb County is a district (bakhsh) in Eslamabad-e Gharb County, Kermanshah Province, Iran. At the 2006 census, its population was 129,503, in 29,788 families.  The District has one city: Eslamabad-e Gharb. The District has four rural districts (dehestan): Hasanabad Rural District, Howmeh-ye Jonubi Rural District, Howmeh-ye Shomali Rural District, and Shiyan Rural District.

References 

Eslamabad-e Gharb County
Districts of Kermanshah Province